Van Deurzen is a Dutch surname. Notable people with the surname include:
 
Emmy van Deurzen (born 1951), Dutch therapist
Patrick van Deurzen (born 1964), Dutch composer

See also
Vandeurzen

Surnames of Dutch origin